Steven Dirk Gilmore (born January 21, 1943, Trenton, New Jersey) is an American jazz double-bassist raised in the Philadelphia area.  Steve picked up bass when he was 12 years old and played locally in Philadelphia as a teenager.  At age 17 he enrolled at the Advanced School of Contemporary Music, run by Oscar Peterson, and later in the 1960s played with Ira Sullivan and the Baker's Dozen Big Band.  He joined Flip Phillips's group in 1967 and remained with Phillips until 1971, after which he worked with Al Cohn and Zoot Sims, Mose Allison, The Thad Jones / Mel Lewis Orchestra, Phil Woods, Richie Cole, and the National Jazz Ensemble.  In the 1980s he played with John Coates Jr., Meredith D'Ambrosio, Dave Frishberg, Hal Galper, Tom Harrell, and Toshiko Akiyoshi, as well as with Phil Woods.  He and Woods would remain collaborators into the 1990s.  In 1988 he began working with Dave Liebman, with whom he would work intermittently through the late 1990s. Other associations in the 1990s included Tony Bennett, Carol Sloane, Susannah McCorkle, Bill Charlap, and Jim Hall.

References

1943 births
Living people
American jazz double-bassists
Male double-bassists
Musicians from Trenton, New Jersey
21st-century double-bassists
21st-century American male musicians
American male jazz musicians